Yoko Karin Zetterlund (born March 24, 1969 in San Francisco, California) is a former USA national volleyball player.

Zetterlund graduated from Waseda University in Tokyo and went on to play for the U.S. National team. In 1992, she won a bronze medal at the Barcelona Summer Olympics. After several years of professional volleyball in Japan's V.League, she retired from the sport in 1999. She has since appeared as a color commentator and "guest expert" on sports and variety shows in Japan. She played as a setter and has a spike height of 301 cm and block of 289 cm.

International competitions
1992 – Summer Olympics (bronze)
1992 – FIVB Super Four (bronze)
1993 – NORCECA Championships (silver)
1993 – FIVB Grand Champions Cup
1994 – Goodwill Games (silver)
1994 – World Grand Prix
1994 – World Championship
1995 – Pan American Games (silver)
1995 – Canada Cup (gold)
1995 – World Grand Prix (gold)
1995 – World Cup

References

 Official website of Yoko Zetterlund
 Profile at The Washington Post

1969 births
Living people
Sportspeople from San Francisco
American people of Swedish descent
American people of Japanese descent
American sportspeople of Japanese descent
Japanese women's volleyball players
American women's volleyball players
Volleyball players at the 1992 Summer Olympics
Volleyball players at the 1996 Summer Olympics
Olympic bronze medalists for the United States in volleyball
Waseda University alumni
Medalists at the 1992 Summer Olympics
Pan American Games silver medalists for the United States
Pan American Games medalists in volleyball
Setters (volleyball)
Volleyball players at the 1995 Pan American Games
Competitors at the 1994 Goodwill Games
Medalists at the 1995 Pan American Games
21st-century American women